The Cat is a 1966 American adventure film directed by Ellis Kadison and written by Laird Koenig and William Redlin. The film stars Roger Perry, Peggy Ann Garner, Barry Coe, Dwayne Redlin, Ted Derby and Shug Fisher. The film was released in June 1966, by Embassy Pictures.

Plot

Cast       
Roger Perry as Pete Kilby
Peggy Ann Garner as Susan Kilby
Barry Coe as Walt Kilby
Dwayne Redlin as Toby
Ted Derby as Art
Shug Fisher as Bill Krim 
Richard Webb as Sheriff Vern
Leslie Bradley as Deputy Mike 
John Todd Roberts as Jesse

References

External links
 

1966 films
American adventure films
1966 adventure films
Embassy Pictures films
1960s English-language films
1960s American films